Emanuelle Silva Santibañez is a Chilean road skater. He participated at the 2011 and 2015 Pan American Games, winning the gold medal in the 200m time trial. Silva then participated at the Bolivarian Games and also the 2017 World Games in the road speed skating competition, winning no medal. In 2022, he participated at the 2022 South American Games in the roller sports competition, being awarded the gold medal in the men's 200m event.

References 

Living people
Place of birth missing (living people)
Year of birth missing (living people)
Inline speed skaters
Roller speed skaters at the 2011 Pan American Games
Roller speed skaters at the 2015 Pan American Games
Pan American Games medalists in roller skating
Pan American Games gold medalists for Colombia
Pan American Games silver medalists for Colombia
Medalists at the 2011 Pan American Games
Medalists at the 2015 Pan American Games
Competitors at the 2017 World Games
Competitors at the 2022 South American Games
South American Games medalists in roller sports
South American Games gold medalists for Chile
South American Games bronze medalists for Chile
21st-century Chilean people